The list of ship commissionings in 1875 includes a chronological list of all ships commissioned in 1875.


References

See also 

1875
 Ship commissionings